The Fuerte River is a river in the state of Sinaloa, in northwestern Mexico. It flows from headwaters in the Sierra Madre Occidental to the Pacific Ocean in the Gulf of California.

Course
It begins at the junction of the Rio Verde (also called the Rio San Miguel) and Urique River, in the Sierra Madre Occidental mountain range.

Miguel Hidalgo Dam impounds the river near the town of El Fuerte creating the state's largest reservoir, Embalse de Gustavo Diaz Ordaz. The water is used extensively for agricultural irrigation in northern Sinaloa and southern Sonora states.

Features
The river is surrounded by large mango plantations which produce the fruits mainly for export to the United States. The former capitol of Sinaloa, Sinaloa de Leyva, is on the river in the Fuerte River Valley, in the Sierra Madre Occidental foothills.

See also
Copper Canyon — the world's largest canyon system, formed by the six rivers that are the headwaters of the Fuerte River.
List of longest rivers of Mexico

References

Rivers of Sinaloa
Rivers of the Gulf of California
Rivers of the Sierra Madre Occidental
Rivers of Mexico